The National Archaeological Museum of Taranto (MArTA) is an Italian museum in Taranto, Italy. It exhibits one of the largest collections of artifacts from the Magna Graecia, including the Gold of Taranto.

The museum is operated by the Ministry for Cultural Heritage and Activities of Italy.

Some excavated items

Sources

Notes

Museums in Italy
Taranto